Hampton Convocation Center is a 7,200-seat multi-purpose arena in Hampton, Virginia. It was built in 1993 and is home to the Hampton University Pirates basketball team. The arena replaced Holland Hall gymnasium, which holds women's volleyball matches and tournaments. The construction cost was about $4 million-$5 million.

See also
 List of NCAA Division I basketball arenas

References

External links
Official Website
Hampton Athletics

College basketball venues in the United States
Hampton Pirates men's basketball
Buildings and structures in Hampton, Virginia
Indoor arenas in Virginia
Sports venues in Hampton Roads
Basketball venues in Virginia
1993 establishments in Virginia
Sports venues completed in 1993